Wancii, also spelled Wancii in Oromo, is a woreda in the central Oromia Region of Ethiopia. It is located in the Southwest Shewa Zone; bordered on the southwest by Amaya, on the north by Western Shawa Zone (Ambo district), and on the southeast by Waliso and Goro District. The administrative centre of Wanchi is Chitu. Dariyan and Haroo-Wancii have emerged as rapidly growing rural towns. Specially Haroo-Wancii town, which is located at a distance of 5 km from Wancii Crater lake, is attracting the attention of many investors and booming.

The volcano contains a caldera and crater lake with islands and an ancient monastery, all which makes the caldera a popular tourist destination. Warqee (also known as Enset) is by far the most important staple crop in the area.

Demographics 
The majority of the inhabitants said they practised Ethiopian Orthodox Christianity, with 70.12% of the population reporting they observed this belief, while 28.41% of the population were Protestant, and 1.28% were Muslim.

The two largest ethnic groups reported in Wonchi were the Oromo (98.87%), and the Amhara (0.84%); all other ethnic groups made up 0.29% of the population. Oromo was spoken as a first language by 99.46%. The majority of the inhabitants professed Ethiopian Orthodox Christianity, with 93.18% of the population reporting they practiced that belief, while 5.23% of the population said they were Protestant, and 1.1% were Muslim.

Notes 

Districts of Oromia Region